Orthotrichum is a genus of moss in the family Orthotrichaceae. It is distributed throughout the world.

There are about 125 species in the genus.

Species include:
Orthotrichum affine
Orthotrichum alpestre
Orthotrichum anomalum
Orthotrichum bartramii – Bartram's orthotrichum moss
Orthotrichum bolanderi – Bolander's orthotrichum moss
Orthotrichum casasianum
Orthotrichum consimile
Orthotrichum crassifolium Hook.f. & Wilson
Orthotrichum cupulatum
Orthotrichum diaphanum
Orthotrichum epapillosum
Orthotrichum exiguum
Orthotrichum fenestratum
Orthotrichum flowersii
Orthotrichum gymnostomum
Orthotrichum hallii – Hall's orthotrichum moss
Orthotrichum holzingeri – Holzinger's orthotrichum moss
Orthotrichum keeverae – Keever's orthotrichum moss
Orthotrichum laevigatum
Orthotrichum lyellii
Orthotrichum obtusifolium – obtuseleaf aspen moss
Orthotrichum ohioense – Ohio orthotrichum moss
Orthotrichum pallens
Orthotrichum pellucidum – xerophytic limestone moss
Orthotrichum praemorsum
Orthotrichum pulchellum
Orthotrichum pumilum
Orthotrichum pusillum
Orthotrichum pylaisii – Pylais' orthotrichum moss
Orthotrichum rivulare – streamside orthotrichum moss
Orthotrichum rupestre
Orthotrichum scanicum Grönvall
Orthotrichum sordidum
Orthotrichum speciosum – lanceolateleaf rock moss
Orthotrichum stellatum – stellate orthotrichum moss
Orthotrichum strangulatum – strangulate orthotrichum moss
Orthotrichum truncato-dentatum C. Muell.

References

External links
Orthotrichum – Britain's bristle-mosses.

Moss genera
Orthotrichales
Taxonomy articles created by Polbot